List of champions of The 1886 U.S. National Championships (now known as the US Open). The tournament was held from Tuesday 23 August to Saturday 28 August on the outdoor Grass courts at the Newport Casino in Newport, Rhode Island. It was the 6th United States National Championships and the second Grand Slam  of season.

Finals

Singles

 Richard D. Sears defeated  R. Livingston Beeckman 4–6, 6–1, 6–3, 6–4

Doubles

 Richard D. Sears /  James Dwight defeated  Howard Taylor /  Godfrey Brinley 7–5, 6–8, 7–5, 6–4

Notes

References

External links
Official US Open website

U.S. National Championships
U.S. National Championships (tennis) by year
U.S. National Championships (tennis)
U.S. National Championships (tennis)